Marek Tadeusz Kuchciński (born 9 August 1955) is a member of the Sejm of Poland, first elected in 2001. Before 2015, he served the parliament as one of the Deputy Marshals of the Sejm, nominated by the Law and Justice club, and also as the Parliamentary Caucus Head of the above-mentioned party. From 2015 to 2019, when his party possessed the majority of seats in both houses, he held the office of Marshal of the Sejm.

Early life
He studied history of art at the John Paul II Catholic University of Lublin, but did not graduate.

Political career
In 1999, Kuchciński co-founded the "Europe of the Carpathians", an initiative of the Sejm held at the Subcarpathian Voivodeship aimed at inspiring action for the sustainable development of the wider Carpathian region for those seven countries, Poland, Czech Republic, Romania, Serbia, Slovakia, Ukraine and Hungary. Originally, the project focused on Polish-Slovak-Ukrainian cooperation but over time has grown as a result of which in recent years the format has become one of the most important platforms for the exchange of ideas between Carpathian countries. Politicians from Central and Eastern Europe, including thought leaders, Carpathian activists, experts and representatives of non-governmental organisations, meet on a cyclical basis.

In the 2005 parliamentary elections, Kuchciński was elected again to the Sejm and later was chosen to be the Parliamentary Caucus Head of the Law and Justice, succeeding Przemysław Gosiewski. He chaired the Administration and Home Affairs Committee from 2005 to 2007. In the early 2007 parliamentary elections, Kuchciński was re-chosen to the Sejm as he obtained 35,060 votes in 22 - Krosno district. On 12 January 2008, Jarosław Kaczyński appointed Kuchciński as the Deputy Chairman of Law and Justice until he ceased to perform the aforementioned duty on 24 July 2010. On 10 April 2010, Kuchciński was designated by party leader Jarosław Kaczyński as the acting Parliamentary Caucus Head of the Law and Justice party by succeeding Grażyna Gęsicka, after she was listed on the flight manifest of the Tupolev Tu-154 of the 36th Special Aviation Regiment carrying the President of Poland Lech Kaczyński which crashed near Smolensk-North airport near Pechersk near Smolensk, Russia, killing Gęsicka and 95 others on board. Kuchiński was selected as the new Deputy Marshal of the Sejm for Law and Justice on 4 August 2010, after Krzysztof Putra's death in Smolensk.

In the 2011 parliamentary elections, Kuchciński was re-elected as Member of the Sejm and started from the first place in the Krosno-Przemyśl list of Law and Justice, by securing 23,128 votes. He was re-elected as the Law and Justice Deputy Marshal of the Sejm under Ewa Kopacz on 8 November 2011. In the 2015 parliamentary elections, he successfully applied for re-election after his party won a historic victory, as Kuchciński obtained 34,558 votes. On 11 November 2015, Małgorzata Kidawa-Błońska decided to resign her position as Marshal of the Sejm after her party Civic Platform failed to win a majority due to the party's poor performance in the recent election. On 12 November, Kuchciński was nominated by Law and Justice as a candidate for Marshal, he was elected to the office, by receiving a majority of 409 votes from the Sejm. His competitor political activist and Senior Marshal, Kornel Morawiecki from the Kukiz'15 body, only secured 42 votes.

Marshal of the Sejm (2015–2019)

December 2016 Polish protests

On 16 December 2016, during the session of the Sejm, opposition deputy Michał Szczerba (from Civic Platform party) came to the stage with the card which read "#WolneMediawSejmie" (hashtag "Free press in Sejm") and attempted to fix it to the rostrum. After warnings, Kuchciński excluded him from the debate for disturbance and announced a break. According to plan, opposition deputies then occupied the podium and the plenary hall. Subsequently, the MPs of the Law and Justice party moved the meeting to the Hall of Columns, where the deputies voted on, among other matters, the budget for 2017. A number of MPs from the opposition who still occupied the plenary hall did not participate in the voting, and the vote count was done by a show of hands.

"Air Kuchciński" scandal and resignation
On 26 July 2019, Kuchciński's flights caused a lot of criticism in the media. The former Marshal of the Sejm travelled on numerous occasions accompanied by various Law and Justice deputies": Minister of Infrastructure Andrzej Adamczyk, Marshal of the Subcarpathian Voivodeship Władysław Ortyl, Chairman of the Polish Press Agency, Law and Justice MEPs and other politicians, assistants and directors. The opposition (Civic Coalition) accused him of using aeroplanes for private purposes
On 5 August 2019, Kuchciński issued a statement admitting that he was accompanied by family members on 23 flights, and on one occasion his wife travelled without him. During the press conference he stressed that the flights he took were never on a private basis. Respecting the public demands, Kuchciński apologized and paid a total of 43,000 PLN ($11,190) for charitable purposes as reparation for the flights. He always maintained that he had not violated any law, and the Party leader Jarosław Kaczyński explained that the key problem was a lack of clear regulations for the use by officials of government flights. He noticed that former Prime Minister Donald Tusk took many more flights during his tenure. He travelled with his wife between Warsaw and his home city of Gdańsk 520 times.
The numbers shows that his flying activity cost almost 8 million PLN (about $2 million), while Kuchciński's cost 4 million PLN

Personal life
Marek Kuchciński is married with three children.

See also
History of Poland (1989–present)
List of political parties in Poland
List of politicians in Poland
Members of Polish Sejm 2005–2007
Politics of Poland
2005 Polish parliamentary election
2007 Polish parliamentary election
2011 Polish parliamentary election
2015 Polish parliamentary election

References

External links
 Official website

1955 births
Law and Justice politicians
Living people
Marshals of the Sejm of the Third Polish Republic
Deputy Marshals of the Sejm of the Third Polish Republic
Members of the Polish Sejm 2001–2005
Members of the Polish Sejm 2005–2007
Members of the Polish Sejm 2007–2011
Members of the Polish Sejm 2011–2015
Members of the Polish Sejm 2015–2019
Members of the Polish Sejm 2019–2023
People from Przemyśl